Tata Chemicals Europe (formerly Brunner Mond (UK) Limited) is a UK-based chemicals company that is a subsidiary of Tata Chemicals Limited, itself a part of the India-based Tata Group.  Its principal products are soda ash, sodium bicarbonate, calcium chloride and associated alkaline chemicals.

History
The original company was formed as a partnership in 1873 (becoming a limited company in 1881) by John Brunner and Ludwig Mond.  They built Winnington Works in Northwich, Cheshire and produced their first soda ash in 1874.

In 1911 it acquired soap and fat manufacturer Joseph Crosfield and Sons and Gossage, another soap company that owned palm plantations. A few years later it sold the soap and chemical businesses to Unilever.

In 1917, the company's trinitrotoluene (TNT) factory in Silvertown, London exploded having caught fire.

In 1924 Brunner Mond acquired the Magadi Soda Company of Kenya and in 1926 Brunner Mond was one of the four main companies – along with British Dyestuffs Corporation, Nobel's Explosives Limited, and the United Alkali Company – which took part in the merger which created the massive industrial combine Imperial Chemical Industries (ICI). Alfred Mond – son of Ludwig and Chairman of Brunner Mond – was a key figure along with Harry McGowan of Nobel's in bringing this merger about. The Brunner Mond business was absorbed into the Alkali Group of ICI, becoming one of the largest and most successful companies in the world (ICI acquired Crosfield and Gossage's chemicals business from Unilever in 1997.) The Alkali Group became the Alkali Division in 1951. This merging with the Runcorn-based General Chemicals Division in 1964 to form Mond Division. This became the Soda Ash Products (Group) of ICI Chemicals and Polymers from 1986 until divestment.

During the early twentieth century the company built managers' and workers' houses in Hartford, Cheshire.

In 1991, Brunner Mond Holdings Limited, rapidly listed, was formed by the British and Kenyan soda ash businesses of ICI. In 1998 this corporation gained the soda ash production capabilities of Akzo Nobel in The Netherlands to form Brunner Mond B.V. This expanded, three-base, form was later re-acquired by its parent company.

Brunner Mond acquired British Salt, a Cheshire-based brine supplier, in 2010 for around £93 million. This vertical acquisition gave longer term raw commodity price certainty and an economy of transport distance for one of the company's largest factories. The company was bought by Tata Chemicals in 2006.  In April 2011, Brunner Mond was re-branded Tata Chemicals Europe.

In 2022, Tata Chemicals Europe set up the UK's first industrial-scale carbon capture and usage plant, which can capture 40,000 tonnes of carbon dioxide per annum.

See also
 Tata Chemicals Limited
 Solvay process
 Silvertown explosion
 Mond gas
 Timeline of hydrogen technologies
 Ludwig Mond Award
 Melchett Medal
 Baron Melchett
 Robert Mond

References

External links
 Brunner Mond website
 Magadi Soda website

Chemical companies of the United Kingdom
Manufacturing companies of England
Companies based in Cheshire
British subsidiaries of foreign companies
Northwich
Manufacturing companies established in 1873
1873 establishments in England
British companies established in 1873
Tata Chemicals